{{Infobox nobility title
| name              = Lord of Laois
| image             = 
| image_size        = 
| alt               = 
| caption           = Arms of O'More: Vert a lion rampant and in chief three mullets Or
| creation_date     = 1016
| monarch           = Irish King
| peerage           = Ireland
| Protector         = Fintan of Clonenagh
| Family            = O'More (1016-1751), later More O'Ferrall (1751-).
| status            = 
| extinction_date   = 
| family_seat       = Dunamase Castle, later Balyna
| former_seat       = 
| motto             = Cu Reu Bhaid'' ("The hounds to victory")
| footnotes         =  Frequency Comparisons:
}}Lord of Laois''' is a title that belonged to the historical rulers of the Kingdom of Laois in Ireland. It was held by the O'More family and later the More O'Ferralls who ruled the kingdom. The title is first recorded as existing in 1016, in the Annals of the Four Masters. After the O'Mores were dispossessed of their lands in the 16th century, they left Laois, after 600 years. Despite this, they continued to hold the title, Lord of Laois.

History
Notable Lords of Laois include Rory O'More.

See also
 Rory O'More

References

O'Moore family
People from County Laois